Admirl Amos Easton (May 7, 1905 – June 8, 1968), better known by the stage name Bumble Bee Slim, was an American Piedmont blues singer and guitarist.

Biography
Easton was born in Brunswick, Georgia, United States.   Several original sources confirm that he spelled his first name "Admirl".   Around 1920 he joined the Ringling Brothers circus. He then returned to Georgia and was briefly married before heading north on a freight train to Indianapolis, where he settled in 1928.  There he met and was influenced by the pianist Leroy Carr and the guitarist Scrapper Blackwell.

By 1931 he had moved to Chicago, where he made his first recordings, as Bumble Bee Slim, for Paramount Records. The following year his song "B&O Blues" was a hit for Vocalion Records, inspiring several other railroad blues and eventually becoming a popular folk song. In the next five years, he recorded over 150 songs for Decca Records, Bluebird Records and Vocalion, often accompanied by other musicians, including Big Bill Broonzy, Peetie Wheatstraw, Tampa Red, Memphis Minnie, and Washboard Sam.

In 1937, he returned to Georgia. He relocated to Los Angeles, California in the early 1940s, apparently hoping to break into motion pictures as a songwriter and comedian. During the 1950s he recorded several albums, but they had little impact. His last album was released in 1962 by Pacific Jazz Records.

He continued to perform in clubs around Los Angeles until he died in 1968.

See also
List of blues musicians
List of country blues musicians
List of Piedmont blues musicians

References

Other source
Zolten, Jerry (September/October 1997). "The Rough and Rugged Road of Bumble Bee Slim". Living Blues, no. 135.

External links
New Georgia Encyclopedia article

 Bumble Bee Slim recordings at the Discography of American Historical Recordings.

1905 births
1968 deaths
Country blues musicians
Piedmont blues musicians
Chicago blues musicians
West Coast blues musicians
American blues singers
Paramount Records artists
Decca Records artists
Bluebird Records artists
Specialty Records artists
Singers from Georgia (U.S. state)
People from Brunswick, Georgia
Vocalion Records artists
20th-century American singers